is the 12th single from Aya Matsuura, who was a Hello! Project solo artist at the time. It was released on January 28, 2004 under the Zetima label.

Track listings

CD
  – 4:26
  – 4:28 (with Atsuko Inaba)
 "Kiseki no Kaori Dance." (instrumental) – 4:26

Aya Matsuura songs
Zetima Records singles
2004 singles
Songs written by Tsunku
Song recordings produced by Tsunku
2004 songs